Laurent Korcia (born 1964) is a French violinist who studied at the Conservatoire National Supérieur de Musique de Paris. After receiving a Premier Prix from the Conservatoire, he won the Paganini Competition in Genoa, a Grand Prix at the Jacques Thibaud Competition, the Premier Grand Prix at the international Zino Francescatti Competition and a scholarship from the Young Concert Artists Trust in London.

In 2002, he was awarded the Victoires de la Musique as instrumental soloist of the year in France and was made Chevalier des Arts et des Lettres. He also received the George Enesco Prize of the SACEM and the Grand Prix of the Academie Charles Cross.

Korcia performs regularly with conductors such as Semyon Bychkov, Charles Dutoit, Daniele Gatti, Valery Gergiev, Emmanuel Krivine, Kurt Masur, John Nelson, Michel Plasson, Manuel Rosenthal, Yutaka Sado, Tugan Sokhiev, Vladimir Spivakov, Yan-Pascal Tortelier, and Walter Weller. He includes solo violin recitals in his concert repertoire, with programmes ranging from Bach to contemporary music.

September 13 and 14, 2008 Korcia performed sold out concerts at Les Folies Bergère in the 9th arrondissement in Paris. The resulting television special is featured on American Public Television, including several top market stations. Korcia CDs (Sony/BMG, Naïve) are solid sellers in France. His music has been used in movies, commercials and television programs. He was signed to a worldwide contract by EMI in 2008 and his Cinema album was released in Europe in March 2009, followed by such diverse markets as South Korea, South Africa and Australia. The USA release was released 28 July 2009. The Canadian release date was also 7/28/09, through EMI. Mexico followed in early August.

Since 1999, Korcia has been playing on the Zahn Stradivarius (1719), a violin on loan by the French group LVMH, Moët-Hennessy-Louis Vuitton.

Discography 
Cinema - EMI 2009
Violon Passion - BMG France 2002
Limited Edition - Naive
Double Jeux - Naive
Bartók- Naive
Danses - Naive
Une Priere - RCA
Nos Souvenirs - RCA
Tzigane - RCA
Bartók - Lyrinx
Eugène Ysaÿe - Lyrinx
Ernest Chausson - Naxos

Awards 
Premier Prix - Conservatoire National Supérieur de Musique de Paris 
Grand Prix -Paganini Competition
Grand Prix - Jacques Thibaud Competition
Grand Prix -  Zino Francescatti Competition
Soloist of the year -Victoires de la Musique
George Enesco Prize  -  SACEM
Grand Prix - Academie Charles Cross.

Videos 
Laurent Korcia "Vivement Dimanche"
Laurent Korcia "Cinema"
Laurent Korcia Interview
Laurent Korcia on French TV: "Les Valseuses"
Laurent Korcia & Jean-Louis Aubert
Laurent Korcia and AYO
Laurent Korcia: "Minor Swing"
Laurent Korica: "Les Parapluis De Cherbourg"
Laurent Korcia: "Transcending the Violin"

External links 
People 2009
Laurent Korcia - San Francisco Chronicle
Palais Des Festivals Cannes 2007
The Baltic Times
Laurent Korcia & Naive
Laurent Korcia on Japanese TV
Laurent Korcia Double Games
Laurent Korcia Classics Online
World Violinist Link
Audiophile Audition Article
Laurent Korcia official Web side
Laurent Korcia My Space page

References

21st-century French male classical violinists
20th-century French male classical violinists
Conservatoire de Paris alumni
Alumni of the Royal College of Music
1964 births
Living people
Musicians from Paris
Paganini Competition prize-winners